"Dear April" is a song by Frank Ocean, released as a 7-inch single on March 25, 2020, consisting of an "acoustic" version as side A, and a remix by Justice as side B. The acoustic version was released digitally on April 3, and was written and produced by Ocean and Daniel Aged.

Background and release
In October 2019, Ocean previewed Justice's remix of the track at his PrEP+ club night, and made the 7-inch single available to pre-order on his website, alongside "Cayendo". On March 25, 2020 the vinyls began to ship, while the acoustic A-side was released on digital platforms on April 3.

Composition
Ocean wrote and produced the song with Daniel Aged. It has been characterised as an ambient pop and R&B ballad, featuring a dream-like atmosphere with jazz-influenced guitars and "synth-like washes".

Critical reception
Pitchforks Marc Hogan described the song as potentially Ocean's "most understated stunner yet", writing: "It's not the Ocean you would've wanted to see at the now-postponed Coachella, but it's the Ocean we needed to hear holed up alone together in our bedrooms."

Track listing

Charts

References

2020 singles
2020 songs
Frank Ocean songs
Songs written by Frank Ocean